The Elstree to St. John's Wood Cable Tunnel, known as The London Connection during construction, is a 20 km long, 3m wide tunnel beneath northwest London. Constructed between 2001 and 2005, the tunnel carries high voltage transmission lines from Elstree substation in Hertfordshire to Lodge Road sub station in Westminster at a depth of 20m below street level.

The tunnel runs beneath the A5 road for the majority of its length, and houses a single 400 kV power transmission circuit with a rated capacity of 3700 A. There is provision for a second circuit to be installed in the future.

A remotely operated, battery powered monorail system runs along the tunnel, allowing the cables to be inspected remotely using infrared cameras.

References 

Tunnels in London
Electric power infrastructure in England
Electric power transmission in the United Kingdom
Tunnels completed in 2005